Ken Ludwig is an American playwright and theatre director whose work has been performed in more than 30 countries in over 20 languages.

Personal life
Ken Ludwig was born in York, Pennsylvania. His father was a doctor and his mother was a former Broadway chorus girl. Ludwig was educated at the York Suburban Senior High School, York PA. He received degrees from Haverford College, Harvard University (where he studied music with Leonard Bernstein), Harvard Law School, and Cambridge University (Trinity College). His older brother, Eugene Ludwig, served as President Clinton's Comptroller of the Currency.

Career
Ken Ludwig's first Broadway play, Lend Me a Tenor (1989), which Frank Rich of the New York Times called "one of the two great farces by a living writer", won three Tony Awards and was nominated for nine. His second Broadway and West End production, Crazy for You (1992), ran for over five years and won the Tony Award, Drama Desk, Outer Critics Circle, LA Drama Critics Circle, Helen Hayes, and Laurence Olivier Awards as Best Musical. Other Broadway credits include Moon Over Buffalo (1995) with Carol Burnett and Lynn Redgrave (on Broadway) and Frank Langella and Joan Collins at the Old Vic in London. For Broadway, he wrote the book for a musical adaptation of The Adventures of Tom Sawyer (2001), and a new adaptation of the classic Ben Hecht-Charles MacArthur play, Twentieth Century (2004) starring Alec Baldwin and Anne Heche. A revival of Lend Me A Tenor opened on Broadway in 2010, starring Tony Shalhoub and Justin Bartha.

Among Ludwig's other works are Shakespeare in Hollywood, which was presented at Arena Stage in Washington, D.C., in 2003 and won the Helen Hayes Award for Best Play of the Year; Leading Ladies, which premiered at the Alley Theatre in association with Cleveland Play House in 2004; Be My Baby, at the Alley Theatre in 2005, with Hal Holbrook and Dixie Carter; and the completion of Thornton Wilder's adaptation of George Farquhar's Restoration comedy The Beaux' Stratagem, staged at the Shakespeare Theatre Company in Washington, D.C., in 2006. Ludwig's adaptation of The Three Musketeers opened at Bristol Old Vic in England in December 2006.

Ludwig wrote an adaptation of Robert Louis Stevenson's Treasure Island, which premiered at the Alley Theatre in April 2007, played at the Theatre Royal, Haymarket on London's West End in 2008, and won the AATE Distinguished Play Award for Best Adaptation of the Year. Another stage adaptation of the George and Ira Gershwin film An American in Paris premiered at the Alley Theatre in Houston as The Gershwins' An American in Paris in May 2008.

Ludwig's play, A Fox on the Fairway, a comedy set in the world of golf, premiered in October 2010 at Signature Theatre (Arlington, Virginia) in Arlington, Virginia directed by John Rando.

The Game's Afoot is Ludwig's comedy-mystery about the actor William Gillette who originated the role of Sherlock Holmes. It premiered at Cleveland Play House in November 2011, directed by Aaron Posner and featuring Donald Sage Mackay and Rob McClure 
 and won the 2012 Edgar Allan Poe Award for Best Mystery of the Year.

The world premiere of his first play for children, Twas The Night Before Christmas, opened at The Adventure Theatre (Glen Echo Park, Maryland) in November 2011. He and his son, Jack Ludwig co-wrote an adaptation of Charles Dickens' A Christmas Carol entitled Tiny Tim's Christmas Carol which also premiered at The Adventure Theatre  in November 2014.  His play Baskerville: A Sherlock Holmes Mystery premiered as a co-production at Arena Stage (Washington, D.C.) in January 2015 and McCarter Theatre Center in March 2015.

His play, A Comedy of Tenors premiered at the Cleveland Playhouse in September 2015 in a co-production with the McCarter Theatre Center and starred Rob McClure. The play has several characters from Lend Me A Tenor and takes place in Paris in the 1930s. The play opened at the McCarter Theatre in October 2015.

At the request of the Agatha Christie Estate, he adapted the Agatha Christie novel Murder on the Orient Express to a stage play, which premiered at the McCarter Theatre Center, Princeton, New Jersey, on March 14, 2017, directed by Emily Mann, the cast featured Allan Corduner as Detective Hercule Poirot, Veanne Cox as Princess Dragomiroff, Maboud Ebrahimzadeh as Michel, Julie Halston as Mrs. Hubbard, Susannah Hoffman as Mary Debenham, Alexandra Silber as Countess Andrenyi, Juha Sorola as MacQueen, Samantha Steinmetz as Greta Ohlsson, Max von Essen as Ratchett/Col. Arburthnot, and Evan Zes as Bouc.

In December 2019, Ludwig's play Dear Jack, Dear Louise opened at Arena Stage. Dear Jack, Dear Louise is the story of his parents’ courtship during World War II when his father, U.S. Army Captain Jacob S. Ludwig, was stationed in Oregon and became pen pals with his mother, Louise Rabiner, an aspiring actress in New York City. They met and fell in love through letters and telegrams.

Other works include Sullivan & Gilbert which was a co-production of the Kennedy Center for the Performing Arts and the National Arts Centre of Canada and starred Fritz Weaver and Noel Harrison. The play was voted Best Play of 1988 by the Ottawa critics. He wrote a new adaptation of Where's Charley? for the Kennedy Center, Divine Fire, and a mystery, Postmortem. He co-wrote the 1990 Kennedy Center Honors which appeared on CBS television and received an Emmy Award nomination. Also for television he wrote a pilot for Carol Channing. For film, he wrote Lend Me A Tenor screenplay for Columbia Pictures, the original draft of the Muppet Movie for Disney Films and All Shook Up for Touchstone Pictures, directed by Frank Oz.

Other
In 2014, Ludwig won a Falstaff Award for his book "How to Teach Your Children Shakespeare," published by Penguin Random House, in the category of "Best Book, Publication, or Recording". Other honors include two Olivier Awards, three Tony Award nominations, two Tony Awards, two Helen Hayes Awards, the Edgar Award, the Edwin Forest Award for Services to the American Theatre, the Pennsylvania Governor's Award for Excellence in the Arts, the Samuel French Award, and an honorary doctorate from York University.

In 2006, The Times said of Ludwig "...There is hardly a regional theatre in America that hasn't a work of his scheduled." His work has been performed in over 25 countries throughout the world, with translations into at least 16 languages.

Ludwig currently serves on the Artistic Advisory Board of Gulfshore Playhouse.

Plays 
 Be My Baby
 Dear Jack, Dear Louise
 The Gods of Comedy 
 Leading Ladies
 Lend Me a Tenor
 Moon Over Buffalo
 Postmortem
 Shakespeare In Hollywood (2003)
 The Fox on the Fairway
 Midsummer/Jersey
 Murder on the Orient Express
 The Game's Afoot
 Twentieth Century
  'Twas the Night Before Christmas 
 The Three Musketeers
 Treasure Island 
 The Beaux' Stratagem
 Tiny Tim's Christmas Carol
 Baskerville: A Sherlock Holmes Mystery
 A Comedy of Tenors
 Sherwood: The Adventures of Robin Hood

Musicals
 Crazy for You (1992)
 Sullivan and Gilbert (1998)
 The Adventures of Tom Sawyer (2001)
 An American in Paris (2008)

References

External links

American male dramatists and playwrights
American theatre directors
American lawyers
Writers from York, Pennsylvania
Harvard Law School alumni
Haverford College alumni
Year of birth missing (living people)
Living people
20th-century American dramatists and playwrights
20th-century American male writers
21st-century American dramatists and playwrights
21st-century American male writers